HMIS Rajputana (J197) was a s built for the Royal Navy, but transferred to the Royal Indian Navy (RIN) during the Second World War.

Design and description
The Bangor class was designed as a small minesweeper that could be easily built in large numbers by civilian shipyards; as steam turbines were difficult to manufacture, the ships were designed to accept a wide variety of engines. The ship's complement consisted of 60 officers and ratings.

She was powered by two vertical triple-expansion steam engines (VTE), each driving one shaft, using steam provided by two Admiralty three-drum boilers.

The VTE-powered Bangors were armed with a 12-pounder  anti-aircraft gun and a single QF 2-pounder (4 cm) AA gun or a quadruple mount for the Vickers .50 machine gun. In some ships the 2-pounder was replaced a single or twin  20 mm Oerlikon AA gun, while most ships were fitted with four additional single Oerlikon mounts over the course of the war. For escort work, their minesweeping gear could be exchanged for around 40 depth charges.

Construction and career
HMIS Rajputana was ordered from Lobnitz & Co. originally for the Royal Navy as HMS Lyme Regis in 1940. However, before she was launched, she was transferred to the Royal Indian Navy and eventually commissioned as Rajputana. She was a part of the Eastern Fleet, and escorted numerous convoys between Africa, British India and Australia in 1943-45. She took part in Operation Dracula, the invasion of Rangoon, in May 1945, and in September 1945, carried out minesweeping operations off Singapore prior to the formal surrender of Japanese forces in South East Asia.

Post-war service
In 1947, the Partition of India resulted in the Royal Indian Navy being split between India and Pakistan. Of eight Bangor-class minesweepers in the pre-partition navy, four were transferred to Pakistan, with Rajputana one of the ships that remained in the Royal Indian Navy, which was renamed the Indian Navy in 1950.

References

Bibliography

References
 
 
 

 

Bangor-class minesweepers of the Royal Indian Navy
1941 ships
Ships built on the River Clyde
World War II minesweepers of India